Paavoharju was a Finnish musical collective of ascetic Christians formed around two brothers, Lauri and Olli Ainala. They came to attention in 2005 when their debut album was highlighted as "Album of the Week" by popular publication Stylus Magazine.

2008's Laulu Laakson Kukista, their second album, (translates to A Song about Flowers of the Valley) was selected by noted music website Pitchfork Media as a recommendation, and ranked 18th on Metacritic's list of the 30 best-reviewed albums of the year.

The band toured the United Kingdom in mid-2007, playing shows in London and Bristol.

Discography

Albums 
 Yhä hämärää (Fonal Records, 2005)
 Laulu laakson kukista (Fonal Records, 2008)
 Joko sinä tulet tänne alas tai minä nousen sinne (Svart Records, 2013)

Singles and EPs 
 Maxi Ranskikset EP (self released, 2002)
 Minä ja kapteeni/Onni – Joose Keskitalo & Paavoharju, 7" single (Helmilevyt, 2005)
 Tuote-akatemia / Unien Savonlinna EP (Miasmah, 2006)
 Uskallan 7" single (Type Records, 2006)
 Laulu laakson kukasta, MP3 EP, (Fonal Records, 2008)

Compilations 
 Ikkunat Näkevät, MP3 EP, (Fonal Records, 2011)
 Unohdetaan Jo Se Taivas, CD LP, (Svart Records, 2018)

Video 
 Unien Savonlinna, DVD release (Fonal Records, Helmi Levyt, 2010)

Book 
 Tuote, (Svart Records, 2018)

References

External links
 MySpace
 Facebook

Finnish musical groups